Ait Abdallah is a small town and rural commune in Taroudant Province of the Souss-Massa-Drâa region of Morocco. At the time of the 2004 census, the commune had a total population of 2988 people living in 791 households. As of the 2014 census, the population was 2,086, with 643 households.

References

Populated places in Taroudannt Province
Rural communes of Souss-Massa